CAFC may refer to:

 Canadian Anti-Fraud Centre
 Commission for Assistance to a Free Cuba, U.S. government organization established in 2003 to formulate policies for a democratic transition in Cuba
 United States Court of Appeals for the Federal Circuit
 The California Fire Safe Council
 Cobblestone area forming cells in stem cell research
  Corporate-average fuel consumption

Association football clubs:
 Charlton Athletic F.C.
 Crewe Alexandra F.C.
 Cadbury Athletic F.C.
 Carshalton Athletic F.C.
 Consett A.F.C.
 Cork Alberts F.C.
 Cork Athletic F.C.
 Crown Alexandra F.C.
 Croydon Athletic F.C.
 Curzon Ashton F.C.